Club Sportivo Italiano is an Argentine football club located in Ciudad Evita, La Matanza Partido, Greater Buenos Aires. The team currently plays in the Primera B Metropolitana, the third division of the Argentine football league system.

The club was founded on May 7, 1955, by Italian immigrants who lived in Florida neighbourhood (part of Vicente López Partido in the Greater Buenos Aires). The club was originally named "Associazione del Calcio Italiano in Argentina". In 1978 the institution merged with Sociedad Italiana and changed its name to "Club Deportivo Italiano". The club's last name change occurred in 2000, when it became known under its current denomination "Club Sportivo Italiano".

The team mainly appeared in the 2nd and third division of Argentine football, although in the 1986–87 played its only season in the Argentine top flight. Despite finishing bottom of the league and being relegated, this was its highest league finish ever.

Players

Current squad

Notable managers
  Ramón Cabrero (1985–87)

Honours
Primera B (3): 1986, 1995–96, 2008–09
Primera C (3): 1962, 1974, 2013–14
Primera D (1): 1960

External links

Official Website
Mundo Azzurro
Dep Italiano

 
Sportivo Italiano
Sportivo Italiano
Sportivo Italiano